is a railway station on the Takayama Main Line in the city of Minokamo, Gifu Prefecture, Japan, operated by Central Japan Railway Company (JR Central).

Lines

Station layout
Kobi Station has two opposed ground-level side platforms connected by a level crossing. The station is unattended.

Platforms

Adjacent stations

History
Kobi Station opened on November 25, 1922. The station was absorbed into the JR Central network upon the privatization of Japanese National Railways (JNR) on April 1, 1987. A new station building was completed in March 2017.

Passenger statistics
In fiscal 2016, the station was used by an average of 369 passengers daily (boarding passengers only).

Surrounding area
 Kamo High School
 Kobi Post Office

See also
 List of Railway Stations in Japan

References

Railway stations in Gifu Prefecture
Takayama Main Line
Railway stations in Japan opened in 1922
Stations of Central Japan Railway Company
Minokamo, Gifu